Dino Hamzić (born 22 January 1988) is a Bosnian professional footballer who plays as a goalkeeper for Georgian side Torpedo Kutaisi.

International career
In 2009, he played for the Bosnia and Herzegovina under-21 national team.

Honours

Olimpik
Bosnian Cup: 2014–15

Chikhura Sachkhere
Georgian Cup: 2017

Torpedo Kutaisi
Georgian Cup: 2022

References

External links

1988 births
Living people
Footballers from Sarajevo
Bosniaks of Bosnia and Herzegovina
Association football goalkeepers
Bosnia and Herzegovina footballers
Bosnia and Herzegovina under-21 international footballers
FK Sarajevo players
FK Olimpik players
Widzew Łódź players
FC Chikhura Sachkhere players
FC Torpedo Kutaisi players
Premier League of Bosnia and Herzegovina players
I liga players
Erovnuli Liga players
Bosnia and Herzegovina expatriate footballers
Expatriate footballers in Poland
Bosnia and Herzegovina expatriate sportspeople in Poland
Expatriate footballers in Georgia (country)
Bosnia and Herzegovina expatriate sportspeople in Georgia (country)